HD 93194 (HR 4205) is a star in the constellation Carina. Its apparent magnitude is 4.79. Its parent cluster is IC 2602.

HD 93607 is a B4 main sequence star, notable for "nebulous" absorption lines caused by its rapid rotation.  It is included on a list of the least variable stars amongst those observed by the Hipparcos satellite, with a possible variation less than 0.01 magnitudes.

References

Carina (constellation)
B-type main-sequence stars
Durchmusterung objects
093194
Carinae, 229
IC 2602
4205
052502